This is a list of player signings and releases involving Super Rugby teams prior to the end of the 2015 Super Rugby season. The release of a player that was included in a 2014 Super Rugby season squad, or the signing of a new player for the 2015 season is listed here regardless of when it occurred. Players that have been confirmed for the 2015 season are also listed, regardless of when they signed for the team.

Australian and New Zealand teams name their squads for the 2015 season – typically containing 30 players – in late 2014. Many sides also name additional players that train in backup or development squads for the franchises. These players are denoted by (wider training group) for New Zealand teams, or (extended playing squad) for Australian teams. In South Africa, all teams have affiliated provincial sides playing in their domestic Vodacom Cup competition.

Notes:
 2014 players listed are all players that were named in the initial senior squad, or subsequently included in a 23-man match day squad at any game during the season.
 (did not play) denotes that a player did not play at all during one of the two seasons due to injury or non-selection. These players are included to indicate they were contracted to the team.
 (short-term) denotes that a player wasn't initially contracted, but came in during the season. This could either be a club rugby player coming in as injury cover, or a player whose contract had expired at another team (typically in the northern hemisphere). 
 Flags are only shown for players moving to or from another country.
 Players may play in several positions, but are listed in only one.

Australia

Brumbies

Force

Rebels

Reds

Waratahs

New Zealand

Blues

Chiefs

Crusaders

Highlanders

Hurricanes

South Africa

Bulls

Cheetahs

Lions

Sharks

Stormers

See also
 List of 2013–14 Super Rugby transfers
 SANZAAR
 Super Rugby franchise areas
 List of 2014–15 Premiership Rugby transfers
 List of 2014–15 Pro12 transfers
 List of 2014–15 Top 14 transfers
 List of 2014–15 RFU Championship transfers

References

2014
2014 Super Rugby season
2015 Super Rugby season